"Promise Me You'll Remember (Love Theme from The Godfather Part III)" is a song written for The Godfather Part III (1990), the third and final film in The Godfather trilogy.

Overview
"Promise Me You'll Remember" is the vocal version of the love theme. The music is written by Carmine Coppola, the lyrics by John Bettis. The song is sung by Harry Connick Jr. It is track #12 on The Godfather Part III soundtrack.

Harry Connick Jr. sang "Promise Me You'll Remember" on the Academy Awards telecast in 1991.

Awards and nominations
The song was nominated for the Academy Award and the Golden Globe Award for Best Song.

See also
"Speak Softly Love (Love Theme from The Godfather)"

References

The Godfather music
Film theme songs
1990 singles
Harry Connick Jr. songs
Love themes
Pop ballads
Songs with lyrics by John Bettis
1990 songs
1990s ballads
Songs written for films
Columbia Records singles
Sony Music singles